Faggi is a surname of Italian origin. Notable people with the surname include:

Antonella Faggi (born 1961), Italian politician
Franco Faggi (1926-2016), Italian rower
Marcelo Faggi (born 1964), Argentine rugby union player

Surnames of Italian origin